May Stone may refer to:

 May Stone (Home and Away), soap opera character
 May Stone (educator) (1867–1946), American educator and administrator